Sophie Rieger (26 December 1933 – 2 February 2022) was a German politician.

A member of Alliance 90/The Greens, she served in the Landtag of Bavaria from 1990 to 1998. She died on 2 February 2022, at the age of 88.

References

1933 births
2022 deaths
20th-century German women politicians
Alliance 90/The Greens politicians
German architects
Members of the Landtag of Bavaria
Technical University of Munich alumni
People from the Province of Upper Silesia